Information Today, Inc., is an American publishing company. It publishes Internet and technology magazines, newsletters, books, directories and online products.

Information Today was previously known as Learned Information, Inc. Learned Information incorporated on June 1, 1980; the name change was effective June 1, 1995. Learned Information Ltd, an affiliate based in Oxford, England, remained Information Today's European distributor after the name change. Likewise, Information Today remained Learned Information Ltd's distributor.

As of January 2000, Information Today published Information Today, a newsletter (published at least since 1987), and other products geared toward "information users and professionals". That year, it bought Knowledge Asset Media, a company with a similar focus on knowledge management. As of 2012, Information Today ran a conference called Internet Librarian.

Information Today was founded by Thomas Hogan and Roger Bilboul. Its headquarters are in Medford, New Jersey.

Publications

Magazines

Newsletters
 CyberSkeptic's Guide to Internet Research
 The Information Advisor’s Guide to Internet Research
 MLS – Marketing Library Services

Books

Information Today Books
CyberAge Books
Plexus Publishing
Medford Books

References

External links
 

1985 establishments in New Jersey
Companies established in 1985
Companies based in Burlington County, New Jersey
Magazine publishing companies of the United States
Medford, New Jersey
Privately held companies based in New Jersey